The Badger Mountains is a mountain range in Washoe County, Nevada.  The southern portion is within the East Fork High Rock Canyon Wilderness.  The northern portion is within the Sheldon National Wildlife Refuge.

References 

Mountain ranges of Washoe County, Nevada
Mountain ranges of Nevada